Harvey Clayton Rentschler (22 September 1880 – 23 March 1949) was an American physicist, inventor, and uranium metallurgist.

Rentschler graduated in 1903 with a bachelor's degree from Princeton University and in 1908 with a Ph.D. in physics from Johns Hopkins University. From 1908 to 1917 he was a professor of physics at the University of Missouri. In 1917 he began work for the Westinghouse Electric Company as a researcher at the Westinghouse Lamp Plant in Bloomfield, New Jersey and continued working there until his retirement in 1945. He became the research director at the Lamp Plant. In 1922 Rentschler, with John W. Marden, developed an important new process.

Rentschler patented more than 100 inventions, including the Westinghouse Sterilamp™, a lamp for killing bacteria by means of ultraviolet radiation. He was elected a fellow of the American Physical Society and a fellow of the Optical Society of America. In 1941 Princeton University conferred upon him an honorary doctorate of engineering.

On 13 August 1904 in Shoemakersville, Pennsylvania, he married Margaret L. Bender.

References

External links

1880 births
1949 deaths
Princeton University alumni
Johns Hopkins University alumni
University of Missouri faculty
20th-century American physicists
20th-century American inventors
Manhattan Project people
Fellows of the American Physical Society
Fellows of Optica (society)